Scole is a village on the Norfolk–Suffolk border in England. It is 19 miles south of Norwich and lay on the old Roman road to Venta Icenorum, which was the main road until it was bypassed with a dual carriageway.

It lies on the north bank of the River Waveney.

The parish church of St Andrew was rebuilt in the 1960s after a fire raiser had burnt it. There is an east window by Patrick Reyntiens, 1963.

Scole is the birthplace of William Gooderham (1792) and Ezekiel Gooderham (1794), founders of the Gooderham and Worts distillery in Toronto, Canada, later to be the largest in the British Empire.

Governance
An electoral ward in the same name exists. This ward stretches east to Needham and at the 2011 Census had a total population of 2,357.

See also 
Scole Experiment, a series of mediumistic séances which took place in the village

Notes

References
Office for National Statistics, 2001. Census information for Scole.
http://kepn.nottingham.ac.uk/map/place/Norfolk/Scole

External links 

 Scole Parish website

Villages in Norfolk
Civil parishes in Norfolk